Segmental arterial mediolysis (SAM) is a rare disorder of the arteries characterized by the development of aneurysms, blood clots, narrowing of the arteries (stenoses), and blood collections (hematomas) in the affected distribution.

SAM most commonly affects the arteries supplying the intestines and abdominal organs.

Signs and Symptoms 
Varies depending on the location of the affected blood vessels.

Gastrointestinal System:
 Acute abdominal pain (most common)
 Flank pain
 Nausea
 Vomiting
 Diarrhea
 Bloody stools
 Back pain

Nervous System
 Headache
 Stroke

The most severe signs occur if an aneurysm ruptures potentially resulting in:
 Shock
 Loss of consciousness
 Bleeding into the abdominal cavity
 Bleeding into the brain

Mechanism 

 The middle layer of an artery, called the media, made of smooth muscle is damaged.
 Mediolysis occurs when the smooth muscle cells in the area of damage are destroyed.
 Small gaps are formed in the wall of the artery which then fill with blood.
 Gaps create weakness in the wall of the artery, allowing increasing pressure from blood to expand the gaps resulting in an aneurysm.
 Aneurysms have potential for rupture.

Diagnosis 
Often Segmental Arterial Mediolysis is diagnosed after clinical presentation with symptoms as above followed by CT angiogram or MRI demonstrating aneurysm(s). The gold standard method for confirming the diagnosis is surgical resection of the affected area of blood vessel followed by histologic investigation under a microscope. Segmental Arterial Mediolysis must be differentiated from fibromuscular dysplasia, atherosclerosis, and other systemic vasculidites including polyarteritis nodosa, Takayasu's arteritis, Behcet's disease, cystic medial necrosis, and cystic adventitial artery disease.

Treatment 
Patients presenting with bleeding into the abdominal cavity require possible blood transfusions and emergent intervention with coil embolization via catheter angiography. Patients without active bleeding, but diagnosed aneurysms should have strict blood pressure control with antihypertensive drugs to decrease the risk of aneurysm rupture.

Epidemiology 
Since it was first reported in 1976 there have been 101 documented cases of Segmental Arterial Mediolysis. Although typically seen in older patients with an average age of 57 years old, it can affect patients of any age and does not favor one gender or the other.

References

Vascular diseases
Diseases of arteries, arterioles and capillaries